This is a list of airports in Yemen, sorted by location.

Yemen, officially the Republic of Yemen, is a country located in Western Asia, occupying the southwestern to southern end of the Arabian Peninsula. It is bordered by Saudi Arabia to the north, the Red Sea to the west, the Gulf of Aden and Arabian Sea to the south, and Oman to the east. The capital and largest city of Yemen is Sana'a.

Yemen is divided into twenty governorates (muhafazah) and the Capital district. The governorates are subdivided into 333 districts (muderiah), which are subdivided into 2,210 sub-districts, and then into 38,284 villages (as of 2001).

On 28 March 2015, a no-fly zone was imposed over the country by the Saudi Air Force as part of the 2015 military intervention in Yemen. The blockade was lifted in November 2015 and reinstated in February 2016. The blockade was lifted in November 2017. Flights were cancelled once again, for four days (28-31 January 2018), but resumed on 1 February 2018.



Airports

Airport names shown in bold currently have scheduled passenger service on commercial airlines (post-blockade, only flights approved by the Saudi-led alliance are permitted). Airport names shown in italic had no scheduled passenger flights before the blockade and currently still don't. The rest of the airports had commercial passenger flights before the blockade and all flights are currently suspended.

See also

 Transport in Yemen
 List of airports by ICAO code: O#OY - Yemen
 Wikipedia: WikiProject Aviation/Airline destination lists: Asia#Yemen

References 

 
  - includes IATA codes
 
 

 
Yemen
Airports
Airports
Yemen